Wong-Chu is a supervillain appearing in American comic books published by Marvel Comics. He usually appears as an adversary of Iron Man and was the first figure that he faced and creates the moral dilemma prevalent throughout the Iron Man canon.

Publication history
Created by writer Larry Lieber and artists Jack Kirby and Don Heck, Wong-Chu first appeared in Tales of Suspense #39 (March 1963).

Fictional character biography
Wong-Chu once served as a commander for the Vietnamese congress during the Vietnam War. At the start of the story, he was shown offering to free the village if he could be beaten in wrestling. When a reckless American contingent triggered a booby trap in the Vietnamese jungles while testing a new weapon, one of Wong-Chu's commanders found a survivor in the form of Tony Stark. Wong-Chu reviewed the unconscious civilian's papers and learned that Stark was a famous weapons inventor. Wong-Chu's assistant Hsaio informed him that the shrapnel in Stark's heart should kill him within the week. Wong-Chu tried to capitalize on this by telling Stark that he was dying and that, if he created a powerful new weapon for him, then his surgeons would save him. Stark realized that Wong-Chu was lying, thinking that if they could have removed the shrapnel then they would have done it then so that Stark might live long enough to continue to develop weapons for them. Hoping that his last act would be to defeat Wong-Chu, Stark pretended to agree. Wong-Chu then supplied whatever tools and scrap iron Stark might require, and eventually lent the American the assistance of his own manservant, Ho Yinsen, a once highly respected and brilliant Nobel laureate physicist. Tony and Yinsen needed six days to complete the weapon Stark was building, the first suit of Iron Man's armor. On the seventh day, the two finished the Iron Man armor just as Stark's condition became critical, and he could no longer stand. Stark was no sooner outfitted in his new armor for the first time and beginning to recharge it than the alarm they had installed earlier in the week went off, warning them that Wong-Chu was approaching. Yinsen ran outside, distracting the guards long enough to give Iron Man time to charge his armor. Wong-Chu killed Yinsen as Iron Man finished charging his armor, but failed to notice that Stark was in the Iron Man armor, and hiding on the ceiling. Unable to find Stark, Wong-Chu had Hsaio prepare his favorite sport, which involved wrestling with the local peasants. After defeating a peasant, Wong-Chu demanded the next challenger, and a man in heavy clothing challenged him. To his dismay, the next challenger ended up being Stark in the Iron Man armor who ended up defeating Wong-Chu. After small arms fire failed to kill Iron Man, who used a crude repulsor mechanism to turn away heavy artillery, Wong-Chu made an attempt to call for backup over the loudspeaker in a nearby observation tower. This failed because Iron Man interfered with it and instead sent out a message for the guards to flee. Wong-Chu then tried to escape Iron Man and kill the prisoners. But instead, he was killed in an ammo dump explosion that Iron Man caused.

It was later revealed that Wong-Chu had never been his own boss, but instead had been a pawn of Mandarin, a "yellow supremacist" who in time became Iron Man's greatest enemy and had been the Starks's greatest enemy for his entire life before this all the time.

It is revealed that Wong-Chu survived the munitions shed explosion and that Yinsen's brain was preserved alive, salvaged by an interdimensional merchant called Doctor Midas. Doctor Midas sold Yinsen's brain in an auction to Wong-Chu. Iron Man helps the Sons of Yinsen defeat Wong-Chu where Wong-Chu is beheaded by one of the Sons of Yinsen. Iron Man recovered Yinsen's brain after that.

Wong-Chu's brain was resurrected and placed in a robotic body.

Powers and abilities
Though Wong-Chu possessed no super-human powers, he was a highly skilled martial artist, mainly wrestling.

In other media
 A character inspired by Wong-Chu named Righella appears in the Marvel Anime: Iron Man episode "A Twist of Memory, a Turn of the Mind", voiced by Vic Mignogna in the English dub.
 Wong-Chu appears in The Invincible Iron Man, voiced by James Sie. This version is the cruel commander of a small guerilla force called the "Jade Dragons", which is dedicated to stopping the Mandarin from resurrecting. Wong-Chu is later killed by his protégé Li Mei.

References

External links
 Wong-Chu at Marvel Wikia
 Wong-Chu at Comic Vine

Fictional wrestlers
Characters created by Don Heck
Characters created by Jack Kirby
Characters created by Larry Lieber
Characters created by Stan Lee
Comics characters introduced in 1963
Fictional Chinese people
Fictional commanders
Fictional warlords
Marvel Comics martial artists
Marvel Comics supervillains